North Hempstead Beach Park (officially known as Bar Beach and Hempstead Harbor Parks) is a beach located on Hempstead Harbor in Port Washington, in Nassau County, on the North Shore of Long Island, in New York, United States. It is located in and owned and operated by the Town of North Hempstead.

Description 
What is now North Hempstead Beach Park used to be two separate parks: Bar Beach Town Park (operated by the Town of North Hempstead) and Hempstead Harbor County Park (operated by Nassau County). The name was changed to its current name in 2008, following the Town's takeover. It is located off of West Shore Road (Nassau County Route 15), and is only accessible (with a fee) to residents of Nassau County.

In the 2000s (ca. late 2007), Nassau County transferred ownership of their portion of park space to the Town of North Hempstead. The transfer of ownership was performed as a cost-saving initiative by Nassau County.

After beginning renovations to this portion of the beach following the takeover, the Town of North Hempstead re-opened the entire property in the spring of 2008 as North Hempstead Beach Park.

Amenities in the park include but are not limited to athletic fields (including little league baseball fields), an amphitheater, shuffleboard courts, the beach, the promenade, bathhouses, and boating and fishing facilities.

In the early 2020s, it was announced that the park will undergo a major renovation project.

Annual events 
A fireworks display sometimes takes place at the beach on Memorial Day and for the Fourth of July.

In addition to the annual firework shows on Memorial Day and July 4th, the beach is host to "Beachfest", an end of summer festival which is held each September. Beachfest features music, games, food vendors, and attractions for all ages.

See also 

 Manhasset Valley Park – Another former Nassau County park now operated by the Town of North Hempstead.
 Tappan Beach – Another beach on Hempstead Harbor, operated by the adjacent Town of Oyster Bay.

References

External links 

 Official website

Town of North Hempstead, New York
Parks in Nassau County, New York
Beaches of Nassau County, New York